Alexander Phillip Badolato (born 23 February 2005), is an Australian professional footballer who plays as a forward for Western Sydney Wanderers.

References

External links

Living people
2005 births
Australian soccer players
Association football forwards
Western Sydney Wanderers FC players
A-League Men players
National Premier Leagues players